Mount Misch is a remote 7,435 ft mountain summit in the North Cascades, in Skagit County of Washington state. It is the highest point of the Buckindy Range, or Buckindy Ridge. It is located 19 miles east-northeast of Darrington, Washington, and 15 miles north-northwest of Glacier Peak which is one of the Cascade stratovolcanoes. It is situated in the Glacier Peak Wilderness on land administered by the Mount Baker-Snoqualmie National Forest. Mount Misch was named by mountaineer and author Fred Beckey for his friend Peter Misch (1909-1987), University of Washington geology professor and mountaineer, who was renowned for his study of the North Cascades. Precipitation runoff from Mount Misch and the unnamed Goat Creek glacier on its east slope drains into tributaries of the Suiattle River and ultimately the Skagit River.

Climate

Mount Misch is located in the marine west coast climate zone of western North America. Most weather fronts originate in the Pacific Ocean, and travel northeast toward the Cascade Mountains. As fronts approach the North Cascades, they are forced upward by the peaks of the Cascade Range, causing them to drop their moisture in the form of rain or snowfall onto the Cascades (Orographic lift). As a result, the west side of the North Cascades experiences high precipitation, especially during the winter months in the form of snowfall. During winter months, weather is usually cloudy, but, due to high pressure systems over the Pacific Ocean that intensify during summer months, there is often little or no cloud cover during the summer.

Geology

The North Cascades features some of the most rugged topography in the Cascade Range with craggy peaks, ridges, and deep glacial valleys. Geological events occurring many years ago created the diverse topography and drastic elevation changes over the Cascade Range leading to the various climate differences. These climate differences lead to vegetation variety defining the ecoregions in this area.

The history of the formation of the Cascade Mountains dates back millions of years ago to the late Eocene Epoch. With the North American Plate overriding the Pacific Plate, episodes of volcanic igneous activity persisted.  In addition, small fragments of the oceanic and continental lithosphere called terranes created the North Cascades about 50 million years ago.

During the Pleistocene period dating back over two million years ago, glaciation advancing and retreating repeatedly scoured the landscape leaving deposits of rock debris. The “U”-shaped cross section of the river valleys are a result of recent glaciation. Uplift and faulting in combination with glaciation have been the dominant processes which have created the tall peaks and deep valleys of the North Cascades area. The rusty reddish color of Mount Misch and the Buckindy Range is due to mineralized breccia pipe.

See also

Misch Crag
Geology of the Pacific Northwest
Geography of the North Cascades
Mount Buckindy

References

External links 
 Peter Misch profile: washington.edu
 Weather forecast: Mount Misch

Mountains of Washington (state)
Mountains of Skagit County, Washington
Cascade Range
North Cascades
North American 2000 m summits